The Bugatti Type 35 is an iconic race car design produced by Bugatti at their Molsheim premises between 1924 and 1930. It was extremely successful when raced by the factory works team. It was also bought by a diverse roster of privateer clientele from around the world. It pioneered the concept of a holistically conceived, race-ready car available for purchase. 

The arch/egg-shaped radiator is emblematic, as is the rear of the car. The tapered stern has been called a 'Bordino tail' and Ettore Bugatti may have been influenced by the shape of the earlier Fiat 804 driven and modified by Pietro Bordino. The car has also become synonymous with being the first to use cast alloy wheels.

The Type 35 was phenomenally successful, winning over 1,000 races in its time. It took the Grand Prix World Championship in 1926 after winning 351 races and setting 47 records in the two prior years. At its height the Type 35 averaged 14 race wins per week. Bugatti won the Targa Florio for five consecutive years, from 1925 through 1929, with the Type 35.

The Bugatti Type 35 was continually being modified and improved upon, but broadly falls into the following nomenclature:

Type 35 (naturally aspirated)
This original, defining model was introduced at the 1924 French Grand Prix, held at Lyon. The inaugural outing for the Type 35 was not a success due to fitment of badly-vulcanised Dunlop tyres. Despite this, the model showed promise and became increasingly competitive with refinements being made.

The car used an evolution of the three-valve 2.0 L (1991 cc/121 in³) overhead cam straight-eight engine first seen on the Type 29. Bore was 60 mm and stroke was 88 mm as on many previous Bugatti models. 

This new powerplant featured a sophisticated roller bearing system, numbering five in total. This allowed the engine to rev to 6,000 rpm. Output was up to 90 hp (67 kW). The cable-operated drum brakes system was very popular and adaptable.  Alloy wheels were a novelty, as was the hollow front axle for reduced unsprung weight. Another feature of the Type 35 that was to become a Bugatti trademark was passing the springs through the front axle rather than simply U-bolting them together as was done on their earlier cars.

96 of these un-supercharged T35 examples were produced.

Type 35A

A mechanically simpler version of the Type 35 appeared in May 1925. Intended for road use while retaining the 'racing look', several were raced anyway and with some success. The public nicknamed the model "Tecla" after a famous maker of imitation jewellery. The Tecla's engine used plain bearings on the crankshaft (for ease of maintenance), smaller valves, and coil ignition like the Type 30, it was normally delivered on regular wire-spoked wheels. 

139 examples of the Type 35A were produced.

Type 35T
Bugatti introduced a special model for the 1926 Targa Florio race with engine displacement set to 2.3 L (2262 cc/138 in³) with a longer 100 mm stroke; the car could not be used at Grand Prix due to rules limiting capacity to 2.0 L. 

13 T35Ts were produced.

Type 35C

The Type 35C was introduced in 1926 and featured a Roots supercharger, despite Ettore Bugatti's disdain for forced induction. Output was nearly 128 hp (95 kW) with a single Zenith carburettor. The Type 35C came first and second during its first race outing at the 1926 Milan Grand Prix held at Monza. This 2 litre supercharged configuration continued to be very dependable. 

In 1929, Bugatti was charging  for the Type 35C. French pilot Guy Bouriat bought two in March 1929.  

Approximately 45 examples left the factory.

Type 35B

Named by the factory "Type 35TC" (Targa Compressor), this most powerful version became known colloquially as the "T35B". It shared the 2.3 L engine of the Type 35T this time with a large supercharger added. Output was 138 hp (102 kW). A British Racing Green Type 35B driven by William Grover-Williams won the inaugural 1929 Monaco Grand Prix. While having more torque, the Type 35B did not rev as high and engine fuel consumption levels were such that the factory reverted to producing the T35C. 

Around 37 Type 35B were produced.

Type 37

The Type 37 sports car used the same chassis and bodywork as the full-power Type 35, but were mostly delivered with wire wheels. Fitted with a new 1.5 L (1496 cc/91 in³) straight-4 engine, it was easier to maintain for many privateer drivers. This engine was a SOHC three-valve design and produced 60 hp (44 kW). The same engine went on to be used in the Type 40.

Around 223 Type 37s were built.

Type 37A

The supercharged Type 37A enabled engine output to reach . It also had larger shrouded brake drums.

Around 67 Type 37As were produced.

Type 39
The Type 39 was similar to the Type 35 except for the engine crankshaft, modified to produce a smaller 1.5 L (1493 cc/91 in³). Stroke was down from 88 mm to 66 mm, and a mix of plain and roller bearings were used in the crank. 

10 examples were produced (some being supercharged (Type 39A)).

A single 1.1 L (1092 cc/66 in³) version was also created by reducing the bore of the engine to 51.3 mm.

Notable race victories

References

External links
Bugatti Club France page

35
Grand Prix cars
24 Hours of Le Mans race cars